Galina Leonidovna Yuzefovich (:ru:Гали́на Леони́довна Юзефо́вич) is a Russian literary critic, teacher, and columnist. She is the daughter of two prominent Russian writers   and Leonid Yuzefovich.

Biography 

Galina graduated from the Russian State University for the Humanities in 1999. By then, she had already started publishing her literary reviews. As a journalist, she published in Vedomosti, Ogoniok, Expert, Itogi, Znamya, etc.

In 2013, she joined the jury of the Russian literary award .

Since 2014, she's having her weekly column in Meduza writing about book business and new publications in the literature world. She confesses to read at least 3 books per week, looking through 5 more.

Her peers consider Yuzefovich to be the most influential literary critic in RuNet, publishers state that her reviews on the cover significantly raise sells for every book. She also hosts her radio show on Mayak and leads a course on literary criticism in Moscow Creative Writing School.

In 2016 Yuzefovich released a collection of essays under the title ‘Wonderous adventures of the pilot-fish: 150000 words on literature’ («Удивительные приключения рыбы-лоцмана: 150 000 слов о литературе»). In 2018, she released her second book ‘Bestsellers. How Everything Works in the World of Literature’ («О чём говорят бестселлеры. Как всё устроено в книжном мире»). In 2020, Yuzefovich released her new book, ‘Mysterious Map’ (ru «Таинственная карта»).

Yuzefovich publicly condemned the 2022 Russian invasion of Ukraine, in early spring 2022 she and her family moved to Turkey. Soon, she launched a podcast on Meduza, dedicated to role of books and reading as possible soothe for soul in war time.

References

Bibliography 

Meduza
1975 births
Living people
Journalists from Moscow
Russian people of Jewish descent
Russian bloggers
Russian women bloggers
Russian editors
Russian women editors
Russian radio presenters
Russian women radio presenters